Actinoplanes cibodasensis is a bacterium from the genus Actinoplanes which has been isolated from leaf litter from the Cibodas Botanical Garden in Indonesia.

References 

Micromonosporaceae
Bacteria described in 2015